Ishrat Jahan may refer to:

 Ishrat Jahan (lawyer) – an Indian practising lawyer and former municipal councillor in Delhi
 Ishrat Jahan encounter killing – a killing of four persons, one of whom was named Ishrat Jahan, by police and intelligence officers in Ahmedabad, Gujarat, India
 Ishrat Jahan Chaity – a Bangladeshi actress